Richard Gasquet was the defending champion but withdrew before the tournament began.

Jo-Wilfried Tsonga won the title, defeating Diego Schwartzman in the final, 6–3, 7–5.

Seeds
The top four seeds receive a bye into the second round.

Draw

Finals

Top half

Bottom half

Qualifying

Seeds

Qualifiers

Qualifying draw

First qualifier

Second qualifier

Third qualifier

Fourth qualifier

References
 Main draw
 Qualifying draw

2017 ATP World Tour
2017 Singles